Kolp is a rural locality (a selo) in Kupreyevskoye Rural Settlement, Gus-Khrustalny District, Vladimir Oblast, Russia. The population was 704 as of 2010. There are 6 streets.

Geography 
Kolp is located on the Kolp River, 65 km southeast of Gus-Khrustalny (the district's administrative centre) by road. Talanovo is the nearest rural locality.

References 

Rural localities in Gus-Khrustalny District